Estádio Da Liga Muçulmana is a multi-use stadium in Matola, Mozambique.  It is currently used mostly for football matches, on club level by Liga Muçulmana de Maputo of the Moçambola. The stadium has a capacity of 5,000 spectators.

References

Football venues in Mozambique
Buildings and structures in Maputo
Sport in Maputo